Daruma may refer to:
 Bodhidharma, a Buddhist monk known in Japanese as Daruma
 Daruma doll, a hollow, round Japanese doll
 Daruma Magazine, an English language magazine devoted to Japanese art and antiques
 Daruma (fish), a genus of fish
 Daruma-ji, a Buddhist temple in Japan also called "Daruma temple"

See also
 Daruma Pond Frog, a species of frog
 Daruma uta, a pejorative term for Zen poetry